Hamidur Rahman, BS (2 February 195328 October 1971) was a sepoy in Bangladesh Army during the Bangladesh Liberation War. Rahman was killed on 28 October 1971 at Dholoi during the Battle of Dhalai, Srimangal during an attempt to capture the Pakistani Army's position. The advancing Indian Army and Mukti Bahini column finally captured the Dhalai Border Outpost on 3 November 1971. He was posthumously awarded the Bir Sreshtho, the highest recognition of bravery in Bangladesh. The Dhalai post was eventually captured permanently by three infantry battalions belonging to 61 Mountain Brigade, one battalion belonging to East Bengal Rifles (EBR) and 7 Rajputana Rifles supported by an artillery sized brigade of Indian army fought against a battalion sized 12 Frontier Force of Pakistan army.

Background
Rahman was born on 2 February 1953 in Khardo Khalishpur village (Renamed Hamid Nagar) in Moheshpur thana of the Jhenaidah District. Hamidur Rahman Degree College was named in his honour. He was the eldest son of his family. During the Partition of India in 1947, his paternal properties fell in India. They crossed over the border and settled in the bordering area of Khorda Khalishpur of Jhenaidah.

Liberation war 
Hamidur Rahman joined East Bengal Regiment on 2 February 1971 and participated in the 1971 Bangladesh Liberation War. During the war he made a significant contribution in capturing the Dhalai Border Outpost at Srimangal. Though the independence fighters came very close to the Border Outpost, it became very difficult to capture owing to the enemy machine gun which was continuously firing from the south-western corner of the Dhalai Border Outpost. On 28 October 1971, a battle was taking place between 1st East Bengal Regiment and 30 A Frontier Force Regiment in Dhalai of Sylhet. 125 members of the East Bengal Regiment decided to use grenades on the machine gun posts of the Pakistani army. Rahman took the responsibility of throwing grenades, and crawled through the hilly canals.  He managed to throw two grenades before he was shot.
Rahman jumped into the enemy machine gun post and engaged in hand-to-hand fighting with the two crews who were guarding the gun, and at one point neutralised the gun. Realizing the fact that the machine gun outpost was damaged, the EBR's approach towards the enemy captured their first line within a short period of time. After the capture of the Dhalai Border Outpost, members of the EBR found the dead body of Rahman. Rahman's efforts helped the East Bengal Regiment take the outpost. He was buried in Tripura in India.

Reburial

On 27 October 2007, advisers of the Bangladeshi caretaker government decided to bring back his remains to Bangladesh and bury him besides Bir Shrestho Matiur Rahman. It is said  that the last place he stood alive was about 20 feet away from the Pakistani bunker, either in a canal or where the memorial is (near the bunker).
10 December 2007 the remains of Rahman were brought back to Bangladesh and on 11 December 2007 he was buried again at Buddhijibi Koborsthan (Cemetery), Dhaka.

Rahman was posthumously awarded the Bir Sreshtho, Bangladesh's highest award for valor, for his actions.

Legacy
Bir Shreshtha Hamidur Rahman Stadium in Jhenaidah district is named after him. A ferry was named after him. A library and museum was built in his memory and the village he was born in, Khordo Khalishpur has been renamed Hamid Nagar. Hamidur Rahman Degree College was named in his honour. Adamjee Cantonment College, a prestigious institution of Bangladesh has one of their houses named after Hamidur Rahman.

References 

1953 births
1971 deaths
Bangladeshi military personnel
People killed in the Bangladesh Liberation War
Recipients of the Bir Sreshtho
Burials at Mirpur Martyred Intellectual Graveyard
People from Jhenaidah District
Mukti Bahini personnel
Srimangal Upazila